Glucan endo-1,3-beta-D-glucosidase (endo-1,3-beta-glucanase, laminarinase, laminaranase, oligo-1,3-glucosidase, callase, beta-1,3-glucanase, Kitalase (trademark), 1,3-beta-D-glucan 3-glucanohydrolase, endo-(1,3)-beta-D-glucanase, (1->3)-beta-glucan 3-glucanohydrolase, endo-1,3-beta-D-glucanase, endo-1,3-beta-glucosidase, 1,3-beta-D-glucan glucanohydrolase) is an enzyme with systematic name 3-beta-D-glucan glucanohydrolase. This enzyme catalyses the following chemical reaction

 Hydrolysis of (1->3)-beta-D-glucosidic linkages in (1->3)-beta-D-glucans

This enzyme is marginally active on mixed-link (1->3,1->4)-beta-D-glucans.

References

External links 

EC 3.2.1